The 2013–14 Marshall Thundering Herd men's basketball team represented Marshall University during the 2013–14 NCAA Division I men's basketball season. The Thundering Herd, led by fourth year head coach Tom Herrion, played their home games at the Cam Henderson Center and were members of Conference USA. They finished the season 11–22, 4–12 in C-USA play to finish in a tie for fourteenth place. They advanced to the second round of the C-USA tournament where they lost to Old Dominion.

At the end of the season, head coach Tom Herrion's remaining contract was bought out. On April 24, the Herd hired alumnus and former NBA assistant coach Dan D'Antoni as head coach. D'Antoni was an assistant at Marshall 43 years prior in 1970–71.

Preseason

Recruiting

Roster

Schedule 

|-
!colspan=9 style="background:#009B48; color:#FFFFFF;"| Exhibition

|-
!colspan=9 style="background:#009B48; color:#FFFFFF;"| Regular season

|-
!colspan=9 style="background:#009B48; color:#FFFFFF;"| 2014 Conference USA tournament

References

Marshall Thundering Herd men's basketball seasons
Marshall
Marsh
Marsh